Maine's 6th congressional district is a former congressional district in Maine. It was created in 1821 after Maine achieved statehood in 1820.  It was eliminated in 1863.  Its last congressman was Frederick A. Pike.

List of members representing the district

Notes

References

 Congressional Biographical Directory of the United States 1774–present

06
Former congressional districts of the United States
Constituencies established in 1821
Constituencies disestablished in 1863
1821 establishments in Maine
1863 disestablishments in Maine